Leave the Light On is the second memoir written by Jennifer Storm. The book deals with Storm's recovery from drug and alcohol addiction and her experiences coming out of the closet about it. The book is the companion to Blackout Girl: Growing Up and Drying Out in America. It has been called "fearlessly honest" and "courageous" by We Magazine for Women.

References

External links
 Official Website of Jennifer Storm

American memoirs
Memoirs about alcoholism
Memoirs about drugs